Events from the year 1583 in art.

Events
Italian Jesuit painter Giovanni Niccolo is sent to Portuguese Japan to found a painters' seminary.

Works

Bartolomeo Passarotti – The Presentation of the Virgin in the Temple (painted for chapel of Gabella Grossa, Bologna; now in Pinacotheca there)
Annibale Carracci – Crucifixion
Lavinia Fontana – Newborn Baby in a Crib (approximate date)
Joseph Heintz – Venus and Adonis
Quentin Metsys the Younger – The Sieve Portrait of Queen Elizabeth I of England

Sculptures
 Giambologna – Venus After the Bath
 Germain Pilon – Effigies of King Henry II of France and Catherine de' Medici in coronation dress

Births
date unknown
Alessandro Bardelli, Italian painter (died 1633)
Paolo Biancucci, Italian painter primarily of religious scenes (died 1653)
Antonio Carracci, Italian painter (died 1618)
Nicolaes de Giselaer, Dutch painter and draughtsman (died 1654)
Pieter Lastman, Dutch painter (died 1633)
Juan de Mesa, Spanish sculptor (died 1627)
Astolfo Petrazzi, Italian painter, active mainly in his native Siena (died 1653/1665)
Giovanni Valesio, Italian painter and engraver from Bologna (died 1633)
Hendrik van der Borcht the elder, engraver (died 1651)
probable
Hendrik Goudt, Dutch painter (died 1648)
Jan Porcellis, Dutch marine artist (died 1632)
Jan Pynas, Dutch Baroque painter (died 1631)

Deaths
March 24 - Hubert Goltzius, Dutch painter, engraver and printer (born 1526)
June 8 - Matthijs Bril, landscape fresco painter who worked in Rome (born 1550)
October 30 – Pirro Ligorio, Italian architect, painter, antiquarian and garden designer (born 1510)
December 23 – Nicolás Factor, Spanish painter (born 1520)
date unknown
Orazio Alfani, Italian painter (born 1510)
Lorenzo Costa the Younger, Italian painter (born 1537)
Wen Jia, Chinese painter of landscapes and flowers (born 1501)
Marco Pino, Italian painter of the Renaissance and Mannerist period (born 1521)
Martino Rota, engraver and printmaker (born 1520)
probable
Jean Court, enamel painter (born 1511)
Melchior Lorck, painter, draughtsman, and printmaker of Danish-German origin (born 1526/1527)

 
Years of the 16th century in art